Glen Edwin Wesley (born October 2, 1968) is a Canadian-American former ice hockey defenceman. Wesley played 13 seasons for the Hartford Whalers/Carolina Hurricanes of the National Hockey League. He began his career with the Boston Bruins, and briefly played for the Toronto Maple Leafs. Wesley played in four Stanley Cup Finals, winning it once in 2006. He was the Hurricanes' director of development for defensemen, and announced his departure on June 12, 2018. As of August 28, 2018 he now works as a development coach for the St. Louis Blues.

Playing career
Wesley was drafted 3rd overall by the Boston Bruins in the 1987 NHL Entry Draft from the Portland Winter Hawks, appearing in 202 regular season games over 3+ seasons, scoring 49 goals and 175 assists for 224 points.

Wesley began his NHL career with the Boston Bruins, whom he played for from 1987 to 1994. He earned a berth on the 1988 All-Rookie team. He reached the Stanley Cup Finals twice with the Bruins, in 1988 and 1990, though the Bruins lost both series to the Edmonton Oilers. As a rookie in the 1988 Finals, Wesley scored two goals in Game Four, a contest which would eventually be suspended due to power failure at Boston Garden. His dramatic last-minute goal in Game Five of the 1990 playoffs against Montreal would help the Bruins reach the Finals for the second time in three years.

Prior to the start of the 1994-95 season, Wesley was traded to the Hartford Whalers for their first-round draft picks in 1995, 1996, and 1997. With the picks, the Bruins drafted Kyle McLaren (1995), Johnathan Aitken (1996) and Sergei Samsonov (1997), the latter of whom was Wesley's teammate in his final year in the NHL.

Wesley moved with the Whalers to Carolina in 1997 and quickly became a leader. In 2002, he reached the Stanley Cup Finals for a third time. In March 2003, nearing the trade deadline, he was traded from Carolina to Toronto, joining the Maple Leafs for the rest of the 2002–2003 season in an effort for both teams to make the Stanley Cup playoffs. He re-signed with the Hurricanes at the end of the season. He got his fourth trip to the Stanley Cup Finals against the Edmonton Oilers. This would be Wesley's third time playing against the Oilers. Wesley won his first Stanley Cup on June 19, 2006 with the Hurricanes, defeating Edmonton in seven games, which is his childhood favorite team. When he won this, he ended one of the longest streaks for active players who had not yet won a Stanley Cup. Wesley played two more seasons with the Hurricanes before retiring, leaving him as the only player to have played in each of the Hurricanes' first 10 seasons since the team relocated to North Carolina.

On June 5, 2008 Wesley announced his retirement after his 20th NHL season, and his 10th with the Carolina Hurricanes. He remains in the Hurricanes organization as Director of Defensemen Development. The Hurricanes retired Wesley's No. 2 jersey February 17, 2009, against the Boston Bruins, who Wesley began his NHL career with. Wesley was the only player to don #2 with the Hurricanes, as the number was previously retired by the Hartford Whalers in honor of Rick Ley. When the franchise relocated, Wesley changed his number from #20 to #2, marking the distinction of the number being retired by the same franchise for two different players in two different cities.

International play
Wesley has represented Canada twice, In 1987, he was involved in the infamous Punch-up in Piestany.

Personal life
Wesley and his wife, Barb, have three children, Amanda, Josh and Matthew. His son Josh was drafted by the Carolina Hurricanes in the 2014 NHL Entry Draft and was playing for the AHL's Utica Comets as of April 2021.

Wesley lived in Danvers, Massachusetts in the early 1990s while a member of the Bruins and Avon, Connecticut from 1994 until 1997 when the Whalers relocated to North Carolina. The Wesley family resides in Park City, Utah.

Wesley, a resident of the United States since he played junior hockey, became an American citizen in 2005. As part of his day with the Stanley Cup, Wesley took the trophy to Camp Lejeune.

Awards and achievements
Named Western Hockey League Western Conference Defenceman of the Year 1985–86 and 1986–87
WHL West First All-Star Team – 1986 & 1987
Named to the NHL All-Rookie Team in 1988.
Played in NHL All-Star Game (1989)
Member of Stanley Cup champion Carolina Hurricanes in 2006.
Had his number 2 retired by the Carolina Hurricanes on February 17, 2009.

Career statistics

Regular season and playoffs

International

See also
List of NHL players with 1000 games played

References

External links

Glen Wesley's Stanley Cup Journal
Glen Wesley Fan Club

1968 births
Living people
Boston Bruins draft picks
Boston Bruins players
Canadian Baptists
Canadian emigrants to the United States
Canadian ice hockey defencemen
Carolina Hurricanes coaches
Carolina Hurricanes players
Hartford Whalers players
Sportspeople from Red Deer, Alberta
National Hockey League All-Stars
National Hockey League first-round draft picks
National Hockey League players with retired numbers
Portland Winterhawks players
Red Deer Rustlers players
Sportspeople from Essex County, Massachusetts
Sportspeople from Hartford County, Connecticut
Stanley Cup champions
Toronto Maple Leafs players
Ice hockey people from Alberta
People from Danvers, Massachusetts
People from Avon, Connecticut
Canadian ice hockey coaches